The 1998 All-Ireland Under-21 Hurling Championship was the 35th staging of the All-Ireland Under-21 Hurling Championship since its establishment by the Gaelic Athletic Association in 1964. The championship began on 3 June 1998 ended on 20 September 1998.

Cork entered the championship as the defending champions.

On 20 September 1998, Cork won the championship following a 2-15 to 2-10 defeat of Galway in the All-Ireland final. This was their 11th All-Ireland title overall and their second title in succession.

Cork's Joe Deane was the championship's top scorer with 8-31.

Results

Leinster Under-21 Hurling Championship

First round

Semi-finals

Final

Munster Under-21 Hurling Championship

First round

Semi-finals

Final

Ulster Under-21 Hurling Championship

Semi-finals

Final

All-Ireland Under-21 Hurling Championship

Semi-finals

Final

Championship statistics

Top scorers

Top scorers overall

References

Under
All-Ireland Under-21 Hurling Championship